Marc Rzatkowski (born 2 March 1990) is a German professional footballer who plays as an attacking midfielder for 2. Bundesliga club Arminia Bielefeld.

Career

VfL Bochum
Rzatkowski was born in Bochum, West Germany. In his early youth, Rzatkowski played for the Bochum east district team SV Langendreer 04. In 1998, he started playing for the VfL Bochum youth team until 2009. Rzatkowski then signed a contract for VfL Bochum II in 2009. Only one year later he signed his first contract as a professional with the VfL Bochum. His first game as a professional player was on the seventh match day (2 October 2010) against Greuther Fürth. He came into the game as a substitute for Roman Prokoph (67th minute). In his second match he made his first appearance in the starting squad and scored the third goal (80th minute) in a 3–0 victory against SC Paderborn during the home match on 26 November 2010. He also played against Union Berlin and VfL Osnabrück in his first season with the first team.

Loan to Arminia Bielefeld
For the 2011–12 season Rzatkowski was sent on loan to Arminia Bielefeld. On 27 August 2011 Rzatkowski scored his first goal for Arminia Bielefeld in a 2–2 draw with SSV Jahn Regensburg. On 15 October he scored the loan goal for Bielefeld in a 1–0 victory over Kickers Offenbach. In his one year at the club Rzatkowski made 37 league appearances scoring 4 goals and providing 8 assists. He also helped the club capture the Westphalia Cup, scoring 4 goals in five matches during the competition. By reaching the final, they also qualified for the 2012–13 DFB-Pokal.

Return to Bochum
After a successful season with Bielefeld, Rzatkowski returned to Bochum. He scored his first goal back with the club on 30 October 2012 in a 3–1 victory over TSV Havelse in a DFB Pokal match. On 18 November 2012, Rzatkowski scored his first two league goals of the season for Bochum in a 5–2 victory over SV Sandhausen. He ended his season appearing in 25 league matches scoring 3 goals and providing 11 assists.

St. Pauli
 
Rzatkowski signed a three-year contract with FC St. Pauli in January 2013. He joined the club in the summer transfer window, becoming a key player for the team. On 13 September 2014, Rzatkowski scored his first goal for St. Pauli, the eventual game winner, in a 2–1 victory over FSV Frankfurt. On 5 April 2014, Rzatkowski scored a late winner in a 3–2 victory over SV Sandhausen.

On 12 February 2016, Rzatkowski scored the lone goal for St. Pauli in a 1–0 victory over RB Leipzig. The following match day, 19 February, he also scored in a 3–1 loss to FSV Frankfurt. He went on to score in a third consecutive league match on 28 February in a 2–0 victory over MSV Duisburg. At the conclusion of the 2015–16 season Rzatkowski was honored by Kicker as the best defensive midfielder in 2. Bundesliga.

RB Salzburg
On 10 June 2016, Rzatkowski joined Austrian Bundesliga club, FC Red Bull Salzburg on a four-year deal. On 21 September 2016, Rzatkowski scored his first goal for Salzburg in a 7–1 victory over SC Mannsdorf in the ÖFB-Cup. On 23 October 2016, he scored his first goal in the Austrian Bundesliga in a 5–1 victory over SKN St. Pölten. On 19 July 2017, Rzatkowski opened the scoring for Salzburg in a 3–0 victory over Hibernians F.C. in the second qualifying round of the UEFA Champions League.

New York Red Bulls
On 31 January 2018, it was announced that Rzatkowski was joining the New York Red Bulls on loan for the 2018 season.  

On 22 February 2018, Rzatkowski made his debut for New York, coming on in the second half in a 1–1 draw against CD Olimpia in the first leg of the round of 16 match of the CONCACAF Champions League. On 13 March 2018, Rzatkowski scored the eventual game winning goal for New York in a 3–1 victory over Club Tijuana in the CONCACAF Champions League, helping the club advance to semifinals of the Champions League for the first time. On 14 July 2018, Rzatkowski scored his first two MLS goals in a 3–2 win over Sporting Kansas City.

On 24 January 2019, Rzatkowski joined New York on a permanent basis.

Rzatkowski was released by New York following their 2020 season.

Schalke 04
On 21 September 2021, Rzatkowski signed for Schalke 04 on a season-long contract.

Return to Arminia Bielefeld
In July 2022, following a trial, he returned to former club Arminia Bielefeld, newly relegated to the 2. Bundesliga. He signed a one-year contract.

Career statistics

Honours
Red Bull Salzburg
Austrian Bundesliga: 2016–17
Austrian Cup: 2016–17

New York Red Bulls
MLS Supporters' Shield: 2018

Schalke 04
2. Bundesliga: 2021–22

References

External links
 
 

1990 births
Living people
Sportspeople from Bochum
German footballers
Association football midfielders
VfL Bochum players
VfL Bochum II players
Arminia Bielefeld players
FC St. Pauli players
FC Red Bull Salzburg players
New York Red Bulls players
FC Schalke 04 players
Major League Soccer players
2. Bundesliga players
3. Liga players
Regionalliga players
Expatriate footballers in Austria
German expatriate footballers
Footballers from North Rhine-Westphalia